Ponmala is a village and suburb of Malappuram.

Demographics
 India census, Ponmala had a population of 28,795 with 13,929 males and 14866 females.

References

Suburbs of Malappuram